The 2007 Football Federation South Australia season was the 101st season of soccer in South Australia, and the second under the FFSA format.

2007 FFSA Super League

The 2007 South Australian Super League was the second season of the South Australian Super League, the top level domestic association football competition in South Australia. It was contested by 10 teams in a single 18 round league format, each team playing all of their opponents twice.

2007 FFSA Premier League

The 2007 FFSA Premier League was the second edition of the FFSA Premier League as the second level domestic association football competition in South Australia. 10 teams competed, all playing each other twice for a total of 18 rounds, with the League winners promoted to the 2008 FFSA Super League, and the bottom two placed teams were relegated to the 2008 FFSA State League.

2007 FFSA State League

The 2007 FFSA State League was the second edition of the FFSA State League as the third level domestic association football competition in South Australia. 8 teams competed, all playing each other three times for a total of 21 rounds. The League winners and second placers were promoted to the 2008 FFSA Premier League.

See also
2007 FFSA Premier League
2007 FFSA Super League
2007 FFSA State League
National Premier Leagues South Australia
Football Federation South Australia

References

2007 in Australian soccer
Football South Australia seasons